Norfolk Ferry was a train ferry built in 1951 by John Brown & Company, Clydebank for British Railways. She served until 1983, when she was scrapped in the Netherlands.

Description
Norfolk Ferry was built by John Brown & Company, Clydebank as yard number 661. She was powered by two 6-cylinder Sulzer single action diesel engines with cylinders of  stroke by  bore, rated at 2,480 bhp. She carried  of diesel oil. The ship was equipped with three generators supplying  at 220 volts DC.

History
Norfolk Ferry was launched on 8 March 1951. Her port of registry was Harwich. She was allocated the Official Number 182204. Built for the British Transport Commission and operated by British Railways, she made her maiden voyage on the Harwich–Zeebrugge route on 17 July 1951.

Norfolk Ferry was registered to the British Railways Board on 1 January 1963. In January 1963, she twice returned to Harwich due to a  casting coming loose. Norfolk Ferry served on the Harwich–Zeebrugge route until February 1972, when she was put into service on the Harwich–Dunkerque route, having been modified to enable her to use Dunkerque in 1967 and inaugurating the service on 2 October of that year.

With the introduction of IMO numbers in the late 1960s, Norfolk Ferry was allocated the IMO number 5255985. In May 1972, Norfolk Ferry was transferred to the Holyhead–Dublin route for a short time. She was registered to Passtruck (Shipping) Ltd in 1973 and then to Sealink in 1979. Norfolk Ferry was withdrawn from service in August 1981 and then reinstated from September to October, when she was again withdrawn from service and laid up in the River Blackwater. She departed under tow of the Dutch tug Banckert on 14 April 1983 and arrived at Ouwerkerk, Netherlands for scrapping on 17 April 1983.

References

1951 ships
Train ferries
Merchant ships of the United Kingdom
Ferries of the United Kingdom
Ships of British Rail
Ships built on the River Clyde